Jaan Mägi (26 July 1883 Tarvastu Parish, Viljandi County – 25 July 1939 Elva) was an Estonian politician. He was a member of Estonian Constituent Assembly. On 26 August 1919, he resigned his position and he was replaced by August Ehrlich.

References

1883 births
1939 deaths
Members of the Estonian Constituent Assembly
Members of the Riigikogu, 1920–1923